Group A of the 1999 Fed Cup World Group II Play-offs was one of two pools in the World Group II Play-offs of the 1999 Fed Cup. Four teams competed in a round robin competition, with the top team advancing to the final play-off, the winner of which advancing to the 2000 World Group.

Netherlands vs. Japan

Belarus vs. Slovenia

Netherlands vs. Belarus

Japan vs. Slovenia

Netherlands vs. Slovenia

Belarus vs. Japan

See also
Fed Cup structure

References

External links
 Fed Cup website

World Group II Play-offs Pool A